Tête du Colonney (2,692 m) is a mountain in the Chablais Alps in Haute-Savoie, France.

Standing above the Plateau d'Assy, the mountain provides unobscured views of Mont Blanc to the southeast from its summit. It can be reached by cable car in the winter from Flaine.

References

Mountains of the Alps
Mountains of Haute-Savoie